Mark Richard Howard  is an Australian television presenter and journalist with Fox Sports after hosting, presenting and reporting at various events on Ten Sport for over a decade.

Howard joined Network Ten in 2005, employed for the network's award-winning V8 Supercar coverage for two years.

In 2008, Howard joined Network Ten's AFL team as a boundary rider; during this time he covered the 100th goal in a season by Hawthorn's Lance Franklin and co-hosted the 2008 Brownlow Medal "Red Carpet" for the network.

In 2009, he became the main correspondent for multi-channel (sports channel) One. This major role finished at the end of the 2011 AFL season when the network lost the rights to Aussie rules football. He co-hosted The Game Plan with Scott Cummings and Wayne Carey. 

Howard is currently a commentator for the Fox Cricket’s commentating Test, One-Day Twenty20 International matches as well the Big Bash League coverage over summer.

Howard is also a AFL commentator at Fox Footy commentating mainly on Saturdays and on Fridays at Triple M. He currently hosts his own podcast known as the Howie Games where he interviews all manner of guests across the Australian and international sporting landscapes.

References

External links

Living people
10 Sport
Australian television presenters
Australian rules football commentators
1973 births